Further Explorations by the Horace Silver Quintet is an album by jazz pianist Horace Silver, released on the Blue Note label in 1958 and containing performances by Silver with Art Farmer, Clifford Jordan, Teddy Kotick, and Louis Hayes. The AllMusic review by Steve Leggett states: "Further Explorations is a solid, even striking outing, and if it isn't maybe quite as flashy as some of its predecessors, it is no less substantive and revealing."

Silver's tune "Safari" had been recorded by Blue Note before in 1952 and was re-issued as a single to coincide with the release of the album.

Track listing
All compositions by Horace Silver except as indicated
 "The Outlaw" - 6:07
 "Melancholy Mood" - 6:35
 "Pyramid" - 6:38
 "Moon Rays" - 10:56
 "Safari" - 5:11
 "Ill Wind" (Harold Arlen, Ted Koehler) - 6:53

Personnel
Horace Silver - piano
Art Farmer - trumpet (tracks 1 & 3-6)
Clifford Jordan - tenor saxophone (tracks 1 & 3-6)
Teddy Kotick - bass
Louis Hayes - drums

Production
 Alfred Lion - production
 Reid Miles - design
 Rudy Van Gelder - engineering
 Francis Wolff - photography

References

Horace Silver albums
1958 albums
Blue Note Records albums
Albums produced by Alfred Lion
Albums recorded at Van Gelder Studio